The women's 4 × 195 metres relay event at the 1969 European Indoor Games was held on 9 March in Belgrade. Each athlete ran one lap of the 195 metres track.

Results

References

4 × 400 metres relay at the European Athletics Indoor Championships
Relay